Juan "Juancho" Pérez Márquez (born January 3, 1974) is a Spanish handball player who competed in the 1996 Summer Olympics, in the 2000 Summer Olympics, and in the 2004 Summer Olympics.

He was born in Badajoz.

In 1996 he won the bronze medal with the Spanish team. He played three matches and scored five goals.

Four years later he won his second bronze medal with the Spanish handball team in the 2000 Olympic tournament. He played five matches and scored four goals.

At the 2004 Games he was part of the Spanish team which finished seventh in the Olympic tournament. He played two matches and scored three goals.

External links
profile

1974 births
Living people
Sportspeople from Badajoz
Spanish male handball players
Olympic handball players of Spain
Handball players at the 1996 Summer Olympics
Handball players at the 2000 Summer Olympics
Handball players at the 2004 Summer Olympics
Olympic bronze medalists for Spain
CB Ademar León players
SDC San Antonio players
Olympic medalists in handball
Medalists at the 2000 Summer Olympics
Medalists at the 1996 Summer Olympics